The Bucks County Courier Times is a daily newspaper located in Levittown, Pennsylvania, United States, founded in In 1954 when Calkins Newspapers, Inc. purchased the Bristol Courier, and later merged with the Levittown Times.

History 
The Bucks County Courier Times was founded in 1954 when Calkins Newspapers, Inc. purchased the Bristol Courier. The Bristol Courier would later merge with the Levittown Times and the Bucks County Courier Times was born. In July 2017 Calkins Media was bought by GateHouse Media.

References

External links 
 Bucks County Courier Times

Publications established in 1954